Babbidge is a surname. Notable people with the surname include:

 Benjamin Harris Babbidge (1836–1905), Australian alderman and mayor
 Homer D. Babbidge Jr. (1925–1984), American historian
 Homer D. Babbidge Library